Adășeni is a commune in Botoșani County, Western Moldavia, Romania. It is composed of two villages, Adășeni and Zoițani.

References

Communes in Botoșani County
Localities in Western Moldavia